Federico Pizzarotti (born 7 October 1973) is an Italian politician, who served as mayor of Parma from 2012 to 2022. He was member of the Five Star Movement, and is now leader of Italia in Comune.

He became the first Five Star Movement mayor in a provincial capital of Italy, after being elected on 21 May 2012 with 60.22% of votes in a runoff election.

He left the Five Star Movement on 3 October 2016, after years of tensions with the national leadership of the party that culminated in his suspension in February 2016. Following his departure from the Five Star Movement, he continued his mandate as an independent with the support of the city council group Effetto Parma (composed of former Five Star Movement councillors who stood by their mayor).

On 25 June 2017, Pizzarotti was confirmed mayor of Parma for a second term by running as an independent supported by his civic movement Effetto Parma.

In the run-up to 2019 European election he decided to run for MEP within a joint list of Italia in Comune, More Europe and other minor parties.

References

External links 

 Federico Pizzarotti in comune.parma.it
 Federico Pizzarotti  at the parma5stelle.it.

Living people
1973 births
21st-century Italian politicians
Five Star Movement politicians
Mayors of places in Emilia-Romagna
Politicians from Parma